Harpalus serripes is a species of black coloured ground beetle which can be found in the Palearctic realm and the Near East. In Europe, it can be found in Albania, Benelux, Greece, Italy, Lithuania, Portugal, Spain, Sweden, Ukraine, all states of former Yugoslavia, Central Europe, and southern and central parts of Russia. It is also found in such Near Eastern countries as Armenia, Georgia, Kazakhstan, and Kyrgyzstan, and into Algeria of North Africa.

Description
The species have a pair of lateral teeth that are located on each side. It mandible is simple, with its setae and tergum are both long. The first instar egg-bursters have only one tooth, while its femora have up to 10 setae.

Further distribution
A female species was found in Wallasey sandhills in March 1882.

References

External links
Harpalus serripes

serripes
Beetles of North Africa
Beetles of Asia
Beetles of Europe
Beetles described in 1806
Taxa named by Conrad Quensel